Qasemabad (also Romanized as Qāsemabād; also known as Kalāteh-ye Qāsemābād and Qāsem Khān) is a village in Tajan Rural District, in the Central District of Sarakhs County, Razavi Khorasan Province, Iran. At the 2006 census, its population was 103, in 30 families.

References 

Populated places in Sarakhs County